Lithuania competed at the Summer Olympic Games for the first time at the 1924 Summer Olympics in Paris, France. On Olympic application Lithuania listed seven sports (boxing, cycling, fencing, football, wrestling, gymnastics, and shooting), but sent athletes only for football and cycling.

Cycling

Isakas Anolikas (a Lithuanian Jew) and Juozas Vilpišauskas participated in the individual time trial over 188 km. Due to mechanical malfunctions both athletes did not finish the road race.

Road cycling

Football

Due to lack of funds and general disorganization the team was assembled the last minute. It lacked official documents to travel to Paris, professional uniforms, training and practice. Hastily assembled men did not have time to play a single game before departing for the Olympics. The team doubted if they could arrive on time and asked to postpone the match. The train journey from Kaunas to Paris took about 40 hours and athletes arrived at 2 am, only 12 hours before the first game against Switzerland, the ultimate silver winner. The match was lost 0–9. Lithuania was eliminated from further competition with final 17th place.

Team

 Round 1

References

Nations at the 1924 Summer Olympics
1924
Olympics